Coleophora chenopodii is a moth of the family Coleophoridae. It is found in Japan.

The wingspan is about 13 mm.

The larvae feed on Chenopodium album. They create a pale ochreous-brown, tubular case of about 5.5 mm in length, with some whitish faint longitudinal streaks. It is covered with minute hairs and sand granules. The larva feeds on the seeds of the host plant until October.

References

chenopodii
Moths described in 1965
Moths of Japan